Clair is a French surname. Notable people with the surname include:

Clair (Hampshire cricketer), English cricketer
Benoît Clair (born 1953), French journalist and writer
Cyrielle Clair (born 1955), French actress
Daphne Clair (born 1939), New Zealand writer
Fraser Clair (born 1981), Canadian ice hockey player
Gene Clair (1940–2013), American sound engineer
Jany Clair (born 1938), French actress
Jean Clair (born 1940), French writer
Joe Clair, American stand-up comedian
Julia Clair (born 1994), French ski jumper
Michel Clair (born 1950), Canadian politician
René Clair (1898–1981), French film director and writer
Sandie Clair (born 1988), French cyclist
Serge Clair (born 1940), Mauritian politician

French-language surnames